The Morasko meteorite nature reserve is located in Morasko, on the northern edge of the city of Poznań, Poland. It contains seven meteor craters. The reserve has an area of 55 hectares (136 acres) and was established in 1976.

Natural environment 

The land of the reserve is covered by a forest of oak and hornbeam trees, among which grow a number of uncommon plant species, including

 Martagon or Turk's cap lily (Lilium martagon)
 Wild ginger (Asarum europaeum)
 Tropical hornwort (Ceratophyllum submersum)

Some uncommon birds can also be found here, including

 The European nightjar (Caprimulgus europaeus)
 The black woodpecker (Dryocopus martius)

Impact craters 

The largest of the seven craters on the reserve has a diameter of about 100 metres, and is about 11 metres deep. Five of the craters, including the largest, contain lakes. The date of formation is estimated to be about 5,000 years ago (Holocene).

The first meteorite found at Morasko was uncovered in 1914 by German soldiers working on the construction of a military fortification. Since then, many further fragments have been found, including one weighing 78 kg in 1956.

In September 2006, Krzysztof Socha, a meteorite-hunter from Kielce, working for the Geology department of the city's Adam Mickiewicz University, uncovered with the aid of a metal detector a meteorite weighing 164 kg. At the time this was the largest meteorite discovered in Poland. Analysis showed that the meteorite contained, apart from iron-nickel alloy, a small quantity of silicates (pyroxenes) not occurring on Earth.

In October 2012, a meteorite weighing about 300 kg was recovered from a depth of 2.1 m.

Adam Mickiewicz University is considering founding an educational centre, to draw attention to the reserve and the subject of meteorite discovery.

Points of note 

 The reserve contains the 154-metre-high Mount Moraska, the highest point in Poznań.
 The local bus lines 88 and 188 have stops a short distance from the reserve.

References

 A. Muszyński, R. Kryza, Ł. Karwowski, A.S. Pilski, J. Muszyńska (Eds.) (2012): Morasko: The largest meteorite shower in Central Europe. Bogucki Wydawnictwo Naukowe, Poznań, Poland, 111 pp. PDF version of review
Mindat.org - Morasko meteorite, Poznan, Wielkopolskie, Poland

Impact craters of Poland
Holocene impact craters
Poznań
Nature reserves in Poland
Tourist attractions in Greater Poland Voivodeship
Protected areas established in 1976
1976 establishments in Poland